Abijah Rivers (born 25 March 1988) is a Caymanian footballer who plays as a defender. He has represented the Cayman Islands at full international level.

References

Living people
1988 births
Caymanian footballers
Cayman Islands international footballers
Cayman Islands under-20 international footballers
Association football defenders
Elite SC players